Holmbridge is a small village on the A6024 to the southwest of Holmfirth and south of Huddersfield in West Yorkshire, England.  It is in the parish of Holme Valley and the metropolitan borough of Kirklees.

In the 1950s, it was a site in the Survey of English Dialects.

On 6 July 2014, Stage 2 of the 2014 Tour de France from York to Sheffield, passed through the village.

The village has one pub, the Bridge Tavern, one church, the Parish Church of St David, and a Village / Parish Hall.

References

External links

 Holmbridge in the 1870s
 Holmbridge CC
 Holme Silver Band
 Hinchliffe Mill Junior and Infant School

Villages in West Yorkshire
Holme Valley
Geography of Holmfirth
Towns and villages of the Peak District